Guilligomarc'h is a commune in the Finistère department of Brittany in north-western France.

Population
Inhabitants of Guilligomarc'h are called in French Guillogomarc'hois.

Geography 

Historically, the village belongs to Vannetais. The river Ellé forms the commune's western border and the river Scorff its eastern border. Apart from the village centre, there are about seventy hamlets.

Neighboring communes

Map

List of hamlets

History

The oldest surviving parish registers date back to 1624.

Gallery

See also
Communes of the Finistère department

References

External links

Official website 

Mayors of Finistère Association 

Communes of Finistère